Knory Scott (born 6 June 1999) is a Bermudian footballer who plays as a midfielder for Hastings United and the Bermuda national team.

Scott joined Harriers’ U23s programme ahead of the 18/19 season. He particularly impressed the first team management during 19/20's pre-season campaign, scoring in a friendly against Aston Villa at Aggborough, and earning numerous first team appearances in the early weeks of the season following his competitive debut against AFC Telford United.

International career
Scott made his senior debut with the Bermuda national football team in a 0–0 friendly tie with Guatemala on 15 October 2019.

References

External links
 
 
 
 Harriers Profile

1999 births
Living people
People from Hamilton, Bermuda
Bermudian footballers
Bermuda international footballers
Kidderminster Harriers F.C. players
Association football midfielders
National League (English football) players
Bermuda youth international footballers
Hastings United F.C. players